Hakan Akkaya (born 7 March 1995) is a Turkish Paralympian  wheelchair fencer of sport class A. He is Turkey's first international wheelchair fencer.

Private life
Hakan Akkaya was born in Bursa, Turkey on 7 March 1995. At age of three, he lost his two legs below the knee after he was exposed to electric shocks from touching electrical wires while playing on his home balcony.

Akkaya is a graduate of Ankara University.

Sports career
In 2013, Akkaya began with wheelchair fencing at the local club Nilüfer Belediyespor, which shortly opened up a branch for disabled sports. As no branch of wheelchair fencing existed within the Physically Disabled Sports Federation of Turkey (TBESF), he participated at international competitions without being a national athlete, and won several medals.

Although not a national athlete, Akkaya was admitted to the IWAS Junior World Games held in Stadskanaal, Netherlands, at which he became champion in the foil event. He thus became a pioneer in that sport branch in Turkey, and following his international debut, the wheelchair fencing branch was officially established under the 
TBESF. He took part at the 2016 IWAS Wheelchair Fencing Under 17 and Under 23 World Championships in Stadskanaal, Netherlands, and became runner-up in the épée and shared the third place in the foil events of the age group U23.

After his participation at the Wheelchair Fencing World Championships in 2015 in Eger, Hungary, Akkaya took part in the same competition in the épée and foil events in 2017 in Rome, Italy and in 2019 in  Cheongju, South Korea, as well as at the 2018 Wheelchair Fencing European Championships in Terni, Italy.

Akkaya competed at the 2020 Summer Paralympics in Tokyo, Japan. He was not able to pass the qualification rounds after winning only one of the total six matches.

Achievements
In the senior category, he competed at the world and European championships as well as at the Paralympics in the foil and épée events of  sport class A.

References 

1995 births
Living people
Sportspeople from Bursa
Ankara University alumni
Turkish male épée fencers
Wheelchair fencers at the 2020 Summer Paralympics
Paralympic wheelchair fencers of Turkey
21st-century Turkish people
Turkish male foil fencers